The 1920 Minnesota gubernatorial election took place on November 2, 1920. Republican Party of Minnesota candidate J. A. O. Preus defeated Independent challenger's Henrik Shipstead and the Mayor of St. Paul, Laurence C. Hodgson. Shipstead narrowly lost to Preus in the Republican primary of that year and challenged him in the general, beating the Democratic nominee but coming far short of winning the general.

Shipstead would soon join the Farmer–Labor Party, which didn't officially participate in this election, and would become the first party member to win statewide under that banner as Senator in 1922. The Farmer–Laborites would also become the main opposition party to the Democrats, displacing them until their political union in the 1940s.

Democratic primary

Candidates

Nominated 

 Laurence C. Hodgson, Mayor of St. Paul

Eliminated in primary 

 Charles M. Andrist, businessman, former Chief of Staff to Governor Hammond, former University of Minnesota professor, Democratic nominee for Lieutenant Governor in 1914
 Robert W. Hargadine, former State Fire Marshal, former Campaign Manager for Governor John A. Johnson
 Edward Indrehus, former State Representative, Democratic nominee for Secretary of State in 1918
 Alfred Jaques, U.S. Attorney for the District of Minnesota
 Oliver J. Quane, editor of the St. Peter Herald, Army Lieutenant Colonel in World War I, veteran of the Spanish-American War
 Julius Thorson, Democratic nominee for Lieutenant Governor in 1918, former State Representative

Declined 

 C. W. Stanton, district judge

Results

Republican primary

Candidates

Nominated 

 J. A. O. Preus, State Auditor, former State Commissioner of Insurance

Eliminated in primary 

 Franklin F. Ellsworth, U.S. Representative, former County Attorney of Watonwan County
 Thomas Frankson, Lieutenant Governor, former State Representative
 Samuel G. Iverson, former State Auditor, former State Representative
 Thomas Keefe, businessman, attorney
 Henrik Shipstead, former State Representative, former Mayor of Glenwood

Withdrawn 

 Michael J. Dowling, former Speaker of the Minnesota House, former Mayor of Olivia (endorsed Preus)
 Dr. L. A. Fritsche, Mayor of New Ulm
 Fred E. Hadley, editor of the Winnebago Enterprise, member of the Republican State Committee (endorsed Preus)
 Dr. Frank Nelson, president of Minnesota College, former Kansas Superintendent (endorsed Preus)
 W. F. Schilling, farmer
Julius A. Schmahl, Secretary of State

Declined 

 Ernest Lundeen, former U.S. Representative, former State Representative

Results

Results

See also
 List of Minnesota gubernatorial elections

References

External links
 http://www.sos.state.mn.us/home/index.asp?page=653
 http://www.sos.state.mn.us/home/index.asp?page=657
 http://www.ourcampaigns.com/RaceDetail.html?RaceID=62566

Minnesota
Gubernatorial
1920
November 1920 events in the United States